The 1928 United States presidential election in Ohio was held on November 6, 1928 as part of the 1928 United States presidential election. State voters chose 24 electors to the Electoral College, who voted for president and vice president.

Between 1856 and 1908, Ohio had voted consistently, though generally narrowly, for Republican candidates, because the  heavily Yankee northeast and Ohio Company counties of the southeast slightly outvoted the anti-Civil War Appalachian south and German-American counties of the northwest. Woodrow Wilson, who grew up in Appalachia whose culture exert a major influence on Buckeye State politics, would carry the state in both of his winning presidential campaigns in 1912 and 1916. However, reaction against Democratic nominee James M. Cox, who had opposed the teaching of German in schools when the state's Governor, meant Ohio went Republican by a 20% margin in the landslide of 1920, and five counties went Republican for the first time ever.

In 1924, John W. Davis, although a native of adjacent and culturally allied West Virginia, had negligible support in the Yankee- and German-settled areas of northern and central Ohio. Thus, Davis received barely half the proportion that Cox had, as he was further handicapped by his indecisiveness towards the powerful Ku Klux Klan, and by the complete lack of support from local Democrats in the interests of state offices. Progressive Robert La Follette would receive over 17% of Ohio's vote, close to his national average but his best state east of the Mississippi and Illinois Rivers.

For 1928, the Democrats nominated almost by default Al Smith, an urban New York Catholic. Although he was endorsed by La Follette after his 1925 death, Smith was handicapped in urban Ohio by the state's cities' large "hillbilly" population from Appalachian regions of the South, who refused rigidly to vote for a Catholic. Similar sentiments were felt amongst traditionally Democratic German Protestants in the central part of the state.

Vote
By the week of the election, Hoover was overwhelmingly favored to carry the state, and ultimately Ohio was won decisively by Republican Party candidate, Herbert Hoover, with 64.89% of the popular vote. This is the best popular vote percentage ever recorded by any presidential candidate in Ohio since 1820, when James Monroe ran unopposed.. The Democratic Party candidate, Al Smith, garnered only 34.45% of the popular vote.

Results

Results by county

See also
 United States presidential elections in Ohio

Notes

References

Ohio
1928
1928 Ohio elections